Yves-Matthieu Dafreville (born 17 March 1982 in Saint-Pierre, Réunion) is a French judoka, who played for the middleweight category. He is also a member of the Levallois Sporting Club in Levallois-Perret, France, and is coached and trained by Patrick Rosso and Stéphane Fremont.

Dafreville represented France at the 2008 Summer Olympics in Beijing, where he competed for the men's middleweight class (90 kg). He defeated Cuba's Asley González, Italy's Roberto Meloni, and Brazil's Eduardo Santos in the preliminaries, before losing out the semi-final match, with an ippon and a kata guruma (shoulder wheel), to Algeria's Amar Benikhlef. Because Benikhlef advanced further into the final match against Georgia's Irakli Tsirekidze, Dafreville automatically qualified for the bronze medal game, where he narrowly lost the medal to Egypt's Hesham Mesbah, who successfully scored an ippon and a Te Guruma (variation of Sukui Nage), at one minute and twenty-nine seconds.

Achievements

References
  sports reference

External links
 
 

 Profile – French Olympic Committee 
 NBC 2008 Olympics profile

1982 births
Living people
People from Saint-Pierre, Réunion
French male judoka
Olympic judoka of France
Judoka at the 2008 Summer Olympics
Sportspeople from Réunion
21st-century French people